Zeemansvrouwen  (1930) is a Dutch film directed by Henk Kleinmann, and was intended to be the first ever sound film produced in the Netherlands. Instead, it became the last official Dutch silent film and the last film that would appear between 1930 and 1934. There would be semi-amateur films made in this interim.

Plot
Willem is a well-meaning sailor, that visits the pub of Tante Saar when he returns home. He sees the beautiful Leen come there often as well, who he falls in love with. She is together with Lau until Lau is sent to prison. Willem and Leen then get to know each other better and he promises to marry her after his next return from sea. But upon his return Lau is back in her life and a cat and mouse game arises between the two men.

Cast
Harry Boda	... 	Willem Broerse
Josephine Schetser	... 	Mooie Leen
Raas Luijben	... 	Lau
Jos Pasch	... 	Dronken Lodewijk, vader van Leen
Clara Vischer-Blaaser	... 	Manke Mie
Henkie Klein	... 	Nelis
Daan Scheffer	... 	Kruidenier
Henriette Verbeek	... 	Lucy
Willem Heideman	... 	Daantje
Mejuffrouw Cellarius	... 	Jaantje
Reina Menjon	... 	Bertha
Henk Kleinmann	... 	Dokter
Kees Grutter	... 	Rooie Bart
Dick Menten	... 	De luie

Trivia
In 1930, the film Zeemansvrouwen would have been the first Dutch sound film but due to technical and financial difficulties became the last Dutch silent film.

In 2003, the images were studied by lip readers and the film's spoken material became a radio drama. It was screened during the Biennale on that year in the Film Museum in Amsterdam.

See also
Dutch films of the 1930s

References

External links 
 

1930 films
Dutch black-and-white films
1930s Dutch-language films